Sarnia Regional Cogeneration Plant is a natural gas power station owned by  TransAlta Energy, in Sarnia, Ontario.  The plant is primarily used to supply steam to  Arlanxeo, Styrolution, Suncor and Nova Chemicals and power onto the Ontario Grid.

Description
The plant consists of:
 Three Alstom gas turbines and Three Nooter-Eriksen supplementary fired heat recovery steam generators (HRSGs) 
 Two Alstom and one Westinghouse steam turbines.

References

Natural gas-fired power stations in Ontario
Buildings and structures in Sarnia
Energy infrastructure completed in 2006
2006 establishments in Ontario